The 1989 Illinois Fighting Illini football team represented the University of Illinois at Urbana-Champaign as a member of the Big Ten Conference during the 1989 NCAA Division I-A football season. Led by second-year head coach John Mackovic the Fighting Illini compiled an overall record of 10–2 with a mark of 7–1 in conference play, placing second in the Big Ten. Illinois was invited to the Florida Citrus Bowl, where the Illini beat Virginia.

Schedule

Roster

Rankings

Season summary

at USC

at Colorado

Utah State

Ohio State

at Purdue

Jeff George made his first appearance at Purdue since transferring following the 1986 season

at Michigan State

Wisconsin

at Iowa

Michigan

Indiana

at Northwestern

Florida Citrus Bowl (vs. Virginia)

Awards and honors
Jeff George, Sammy Baugh Trophy

Team players in the NFL

References

Illinois
Illinois Fighting Illini football seasons
Citrus Bowl champion seasons
Illinois Fighting Illini football